Milk Money is a 1994 American romantic comedy-drama film directed by Richard Benjamin and starring Melanie Griffith and Ed Harris. The film is about three suburban 11-year-old boys who find themselves behind in "the battle of the sexes", believing they would regain the upper hand if they could just see a real, live naked lady.

The film received generally negative reviews from critics.

Plot 
Three junior high school boys — Brad (Adam LaVorgna), Frank (Michael Patrick Carter) and Kevin (Brian Christopher) — travel from their bedroom suburb of Middleton to the city, bringing money with hopes of seeing a woman naked. They find a hooker named "V" (Melanie Griffith) who is willing to show her breasts. However, when they decide to head home, they find their bikes have been stolen, leaving them broke and stuck in the city. V speaks with her drug-dealing pimp named "Cash" (Casey Siemaszko), and another hooker, Betty (Anne Heche). Cash has been skimming money that he sends to mob collector Waltzer (Malcolm McDowell), who in turn steals from his own boss, Jerry "The Pope" (Philip Bosco). V notices the boys outside in the rain and offers them a ride back home in Cash's car.

After they arrive at Frank's house, the car V was using suddenly breaks down, so she goes inside to use the phone. Tom (Ed Harris), Frank's father, comes home and is surprised to find a woman in the house. Unbeknownst to V, Frank tells Tom that V is a math tutor and that she's giving lessons to Brad. Tom offers to repair her car in a few days when he is free from his science classes at school. With no other option, she accepts Frank's offer to stay in his tree house without Tom's knowledge. Frank begins a close friendship with V, hoping to set her up with his father. He tells her Tom has no problem with her "job", meaning the tutoring ruse, but she thinks he means her prostitution.

V learns from television that Cash has been murdered by Waltzer. She phones Betty, only to discover that Waltzer is looking for her — Cash told him that she stole the money. She realizes that he is overhearing the conversation and hangs up. With V's car still broken down, she gets Tom's old bike from the garage and rushes to find him. He is on a field trip to the town's wetlands, undeveloped natural land that he is attempting to save from development. He is unable to repair her car any sooner, but she realizes that she is probably safer in Middleton, since Waltzer doesn't know where she is.

At school, Frank flunks a biology test about sex education and must give his class an oral presentation. He decides to use V as a mannequin, and through a ruse distracts his teacher long enough to draw a relatively accurate female reproductive system on her skin-colored bodysuit. Tom and V go out on a date and both realize they are developing feelings for each other. While walking through town on their date, Tom and V run into Kevin's family. V recognizes Kevin's father, who is a client, but he initially says that she has him mixed up with someone else before admitting to remembering her and says that she was a dance teacher. Tom is impressed with how busy V is being a tutor and dance teacher; V then realizes that Frank had actually lied about Tom knowing about her prostitution. V explains herself to Tom and their relationship grows. She reveals that her real name is Eve, which she thought was too biblical, so she removed the Es. Kevin's father unwittingly calls her home phone number, which he had in his pocket notebook, in an attempt to purchase her services again. He talks to Betty; and Waltzer, who happens to be there also, learns from Betty about the trip to Middleton, thus finding out where V is hiding.

V is terrified that Waltzer will find her, so she decides to leave town, but attends a school dance to say goodbye to Frank. Waltzer shows up to spoil their fun. A chase ensues, with Waltzer finally being eliminated. Anxious about her status and afraid to return to her old job, V goes to Waltzer's boss and relates how he has been cheating him. She asks to be "forgotten" by them. The older crime boss succumbs to her charms, and he tells her that he'll take care of things and that she doesn't need to be afraid anymore, while also allowing her to walk away from prostitution for good. V finds the stolen money in a backpack and uses it to buy the wetlands in Tom's name; it is also revealed that she purchased the ice-cream parlor in town, so she can carry on with her new relationship.

Cast
 Melanie Griffith as Eve "V"
 Ed Harris as Tom Wheeler
 Michael Patrick Carter as Frank Wheeler
 Malcolm McDowell as Waltzer
 Anne Heche as Betty
 Philip Bosco as Jerry "The Pope"
 Casey Siemaszko as "Cash"
 Brian Christopher as Kevin
 Adam LaVorgna as Brad
 Margaret Nagle as Mrs. Fetch
 Kevin Youkilis as Kid (uncredited)

Production 
The screenplay written by John Mattson was sold to Paramount Pictures in 1992 for $1.1 million, a record for a romantic comedy spec script. Mattson was sued by Dino De Laurentiis (DDLC); the lawsuit alleged that Mattson's agent had made a verbal agreement to sell the script to DDLC for $1 million, before selling the script to Paramount for $1.1 million. 
The film was originally set up with Joe Dante to direct and his frequent partner, Michael Finnell, to produce, but they left the project over disputes regarding the budget and their fees. Paramount had wanted Dante to work for less than his normal directing fee, and to shoot the film in Canada using a non-union crew with a budget of $14 million.

Shot in various locations in Pittsburgh, Cincinnati and Lebanon, Ohio, the story is set in a Pennsylvania suburb named "Middleton", outside an unnamed city (for which parts of  Pittsburgh and Cincinnati were used).

Reception 
On Rotten Tomatoes the film has an approval rating of 12% based on reviews from 42 critics with the consensus: "Ill-conceived and cheap when it comes to cleverness, Milk Money is a more than a few cents short of a good time." Audiences polled by CinemaScore gave the film a grade "B" on scale of A to F.

Siskel & Ebert speculated that it may have been made by Hollywood executives with an affinity for hookers. In print, Roger Ebert opted not for a conventional negative review, but to portray it as the result of a fictional conversation between two studio executives. Janet Maslin of The New York Times gave it a negative review and suggested "Milk Money may be the first brainless American comedy that deserves to be remade by the French". Maslin said Griffith "brings a certain irrepressible gusto to her role" and "Harris manages to be improbably charming". Variety called it "a misguided comedy with Hall of Shame pedigree" and "The film is obvious, loud, mean-spirited and has its mind in the gutter."

At the 15th Golden Raspberry Awards, the film was nominated for Worst Screenplay, but it lost to The Flintstones.

Year-end worst-of lists 
 2nd – Glenn Lovell, San Jose Mercury News
 4th – Dan Craft, The Pantagraph
 6th – Janet Maslin, The New York Times
 9th – Robert Denerstein, Rocky Mountain News
 Top 10 (not ranked) – Betsy Pickle, Knoxville News-Sentinel

Home media 
The film was released on VHS in March 1995  and DVD on September 9, 2003. It was presented in anamorphic widescreen in its original 1.85:1 aspect ratio.

References

External links
 
 
 
 
 

1994 films
1990s crime comedy films
1994 romantic comedy films
American crime comedy films
American romantic comedy films
1990s coming-of-age comedy films
American coming-of-age comedy films
1990s English-language films
Films about children
Films about prostitution in the United States
Films about puberty
Films directed by Richard Benjamin
Films produced by Kathleen Kennedy
Films produced by Frank Marshall
Films scored by Michael Convertino
Films set in Ohio
Films shot in New York City
Films shot in Ohio
Films shot in Pittsburgh
Paramount Pictures films
The Kennedy/Marshall Company films
1990s American films